This is a list of installations used by the United States Marine Corps, organized by type and state. Most US states do not have active Marine Corps bases; however, many do have reserve bases and centers. In addition, the Marine Corps Security Force Regiment maintains Marines permanently at numerous naval installations across the United States and abroad. The Corps also shares its headquarters with the rest of the United States armed forces at the Pentagon in Virginia.


United States

Marine Corps Bases and Air Stations

Satellite Bases and Aviation Facilities

Marine Corps Detachments

Marine Corps Reserve

Overseas

Closed/Converted

United States

Overseas

See also

 Marine Corps Installations Command
 Marine Corps Installations East
 Marine Corps Installations West
 List of United States military bases
 List of United States Navy installations
 List of former United States Army installations
 List of United States Air Force installations
 List of United States Space Force installations

Citations

References
Bibliography

Web

External links
Military Force USA, US Military Bases
Marine Corps USA, USMC Military Base Overviews

 
Installations
Marine Corps
Marine Corps
United States Marine Corps